FC Alnas Almetyevsk was a Russian football team from Almetyevsk. It played professionally from 1967 to 1970, in 1993 and from 2001 to 2008. Their best result was 4th place in Zone Ural-Povolzhye in the Russian Second Division in 2006.

Team name history
 1967–1970: FC Burovik Almetyevsk
 1993–1994: FC Elektron Almetyevsk
 1995–1999: FC Devon Almetyevsk
 2000–2008: FC Alnas Almetyevsk

External links
  Team history at KLISF

Association football clubs established in 1967
Association football clubs disestablished in 2009
Defunct football clubs in Russia
Sport in Tatarstan
1967 establishments in Russia
2009 disestablishments in Russia